Rohrberg is a municipality in the Eichsfeld, in the Verwaltungsgemeinschaft Hanstein-Rusteberg, in Thuringia, Germany.

The first known mention of the community was in 1055.  However, it was deserted in the fifteenth century, only to be re-established starting around 1500.  Since 1990, it has belonged administratively to Thuringia.

The mayor is Markus Kulle, elected in 2022.

References

Eichsfeld (district)